Gabriela Elena Španić Utrera (born December 10, 1973), known simply as Gabriela Spanic, is a Venezuelan actress and singer. She's known for her roles in several Latin telenovelas, most notably her portrayal of twins in La usurpadora (1998), one of the most popular telenovelas in the Spanish-speaking world.

Spanic has been signed to Televisa, Telemundo and TV Azteca.

Early life

Spanic was born in Caracas and raised in Ortiz, to Croatian father Casimiro Spanic and Venezuelan mother Norma Utrera. She has a twin sister, Daniela Spanic, one younger sister, Patricia, and a younger brother, Antonio. She studied Psychology in Caracas at Andrés Bello Catholic University for a year but left university to pursue an acting career.

Career

Spanic's career started in 1992 when she joined the Miss Venezuela contest, representing her home state, Guárico, which served as a platform to launch her acting career, with appearances in Venezuelan telenovelas such as Morena Clara, where she portrayed the villain Linda Prado.

In 1994, Spanic had her first leading role in the telenovela Como Tu Ninguna, which aired for two years and became one of the largest novelas of the country and had an enormous success, including internationally.

After playing Amaranta in Todo por tu Amor (1997), Spanic moved to Mexico, where she acted in La usurpadora (1998), portraying twins Paola and Paulina, which came to worldwide success when the novela was transmitted to more than 125 countries around the world and became one of the most popular telenovelas in the Spanish-speaking world. La Usurpadora was the first novela to win more than 20 points in the grid of the TV American audience.

In 2000 Gabriela Spanic co-hosted the OTI Festival in its last edition, which was held in Acapulco.

Spanic acted in other Televisa productions such as Por Tu Amor (1999), and La intrusa (2001), before signing with Telemundo, starring in La venganza (2002), Prisionera (2004) and Tierra de pasiones (2006).

Spanic  won the Orquidea Award in 2005 for her trajectory as an actress, as well as the prestigious FAMAS Award for Best Actress for her role in Tierra de Pasiones.

In 2010, Spanic worked with Televisa again when she played the antagonist of Soy tu Dueña. As of 2011, Spanic is signed to TV Azteca, and has worked in Emperatriz (2011), La otra cara del alma (2012) and Siempre tuya Acapulco (2014).

Personal life

Spanic was married to actor Miguel de León from 1996 to 2002. She and her ex-boyfriend have a son, Gabriel de Jesús (born 2008).

Filmography

Discography
 Gabriela Total (2004)

Mejorando Tu Vida Con Gabriela Spanic, Vol. 1 e 2 (2005)

En Carne Viva (2014)

Gabriela Spanic Greatest Hits (2016)

References
 

1973 births
Living people
People from Guárico
Venezuelan expatriates in Mexico
Venezuelan television actresses
Venezuelan telenovela actresses
21st-century Venezuelan women singers
Venezuelan people of Croatian descent
Venezuelan Roman Catholics
Venezuelan twins
OTI Festival presenters
Mexican people of Croatian descent
Mexican people of Venezuelan descent